Lukas Meijer (born 21 August 1988) is a Swedish rock musician, guitarist, singer and songwriter, vocalist of band No Sleep For Lucy.

Together with Polish DJ Gromee, he represented Poland at the Eurovision Song Contest 2018 in Lisbon, Portugal, with the song "Light Me Up".

Biography
He spent his childhood in Ulricehamn. He graduated from high school in Tingsholm and studied at the Uppsala University. In his youth he practiced ice hockey. His brother, Sebastian Meijer, is a professional ice hockey player. Lukas was very close to signing a hockey contract but decide to become a musician instead.

Discography

Singles

As featured artist

References

1988 births
Living people
Swedish people of Dutch descent
Eurovision Song Contest entrants for Poland
Eurovision Song Contest entrants of 2018
21st-century Swedish singers
21st-century Swedish male singers